Xylophilus is a genus of beetles belonging to the family Eucnemidae.

Species:
 Xylophilus constrictus Fall 1901
 Xylophilus corticalis (Paykull 1800) Paykull 1800
 Xylophilus cylindriformis (Horn 1871)
 Xylophilus luniger (Champion 1916)

References

Eucnemidae
Elateroidea genera